Of Fox and Hounds is a 1940 Warner Bros. Merrie Melodies directed by Tex Avery. The short was released on December 7, 1940, and introduces Willoughby the Dog. Avery performed the voice of Willoughby, and Mel Blanc voiced George the Fox and the bear's yells. The short is an attempt to duplicate the success of the 1940 Bugs Bunny short A Wild Hare by giving another anthropomorphic animal the same unflappable demeanor. The names of Tex Avery, Dave Monahan, Carl W. Stalling, and possibly Charles McKimson intentionally draft numbers in the credits.

Plot
The film focuses on a sly fox, George, and a lovable but dim-witted hound, Willoughby, who repeatedly asks George where the fox went, never suspecting that his "friend" George is the fox. Invariably, George the Fox tells Willoughby that the fox is on the other side of a rail fence, which is actually at the edge of a steep cliff. Willoughby's line, "Which way did he go, George? Which way did he go?" long ago became a catchphrase, as did "Thanks a lot, George, thanks a lot!"

Voice cast
Mel Blanc as George the Fox
Tex Avery as Willoughby the Dog

Home media
Disc 1 of the Region 2 PAL 5-DVD set "La collection Tex Avery," published in France in 2010, along with two other bonus Warner Brothers cartoons by him,  Dangerous Dan McFoo on Disc 2 and with Aviation Vacation on Disc 4.
The Golden Age of Looney Tunes, Volume 2, Side 9

See also
George and Junior

References

External links

Extensive critical analysis of Of Fox and Hounds by Steven Hartley

1940 animated films
1940 films
Merrie Melodies short films
Warner Bros. Cartoons animated short films
Films directed by Tex Avery
1940 comedy films
Animated films about foxes
Animated films about dogs
1940s Warner Bros. animated short films